Josiane Soares (born 21 June 1976) is a Brazilian athlete specialising in the hammer throw. She won several medals at regional level.

Her personal best in the event is 63.86 metres set in Tunja in 2006.

Competition record

References

1976 births
Living people
Brazilian female hammer throwers
Athletes (track and field) at the 2007 Pan American Games
Athletes (track and field) at the 2011 Pan American Games
Pan American Games athletes for Brazil
20th-century Brazilian women
21st-century Brazilian women